Northern Tak United Football Club (Thai สโมสรฟุตบอลนอร์ทเทิร์น ตากยูไนเต็ด), is a Thai football club based in Tak Province, Thailand. The club is currently playing in the Thailand Amateur League Northern region.

Crest history

Record

Players

Current squad

References

 104 ทีมร่วมชิงชัย! แบโผผลจับสลาก ดิวิชั่น 3 ฤดูกาล 2016
 http://pr.prd.go.th/tak/ewt_news.php?nid=3056&filename=tak_new
 http://www.supersubthailand.com/news/17933-6/index.html#sthash.1hBrgStX.dpbs
 https://www.facebook.com/ntctak/photos/a.983312821691774/1192316974124690/?type=3

External links
 Facebookpage

Association football clubs established in 2016
Football clubs in Thailand
Sport in Tak province
2016 establishments in Thailand